The Miss South Dakota USA competition is the pageant that selects the representative for the state of South Dakota in the Miss USA pageant.  It is currently directed by Future Productions based in Savage, Minnesota since 2002.

South Dakota has placed four times. One notable Miss South Dakota USA was Vanessa Short Bull (2000), one of the first Native Americans to compete at Miss USA. Short Bull was also Miss South Dakota 2002. South Dakota's best placement in the competition was Madison Nipe placing in the top five in 2018.

The current titleholder is Shania Knutson of Brookings and was crowned on April 9, 2022 at Watertown Event Center in Watertown. She represented South Dakota for the title of Miss USA 2022.

Gallery of titleholders

Results summary
Top 5: Madison Nipe (2018)
Top 10/12: Debra Ann Brickley (1974), Madison McKeown (2016)
Top 15/16: Helen Youngquist (1958), Caroline Pettey (2021)

South Dakota holds a record of 5 placements at Miss USA.

Winners 
Color key

References

External links
 

South Dakota
South Dakota culture
Recurring events established in 1952
Women in South Dakota
1952 establishments in South Dakota
Annual events in South Dakota